Huguette Béolet (born 13 December 1919) is a French former international table tennis player.

She won a bronze medal at the 1949 World Table Tennis Championships in the Corbillon Cup (women's team event) with Yolande Vannoni and Jeanne Delay for France.

In the early 1950s she was ranked number one in France  and won six French national titles from 1937 to 1952.

See also
 List of table tennis players
 List of World Table Tennis Championships medalists

References

1919 births
Possibly living people
French female table tennis players
World Table Tennis Championships medalists
20th-century French women